Qina Qina (Aymara qina qina an Andean cane flute, also for something full of holes, Hispanicized spelling Quina Quina) is a  mountain in the Bolivian Andes. It is situated in the La Paz Department, Inquisivi Province, in the south-west of the Quime Municipality. Qina Qina lies east of Wallatani Lake, north-west of the mountain Salla Jithita (Salla Itita).

References 

Mountains of La Paz Department (Bolivia)